Achanta Assembly constituency is a constituency in West Godavari district of Andhra Pradesh, representing the state legislative assembly in India. It is one of the seven assembly segments of Narasapuram (Lok Sabha constituency), along with Palakollu, Narasapuram, Bhimavaram, Undi, Tanuku and Tadepalligudem. Cherukuvada Sriranganadha Raju is the present MLA of the constituency, who won the 2019 Andhra Pradesh Legislative Assembly election from YSR Congress Party. In 2019, there were a total of  electors in the constituency.

Mandals 

The four mandals that form the assembly constituency are:

Members of Legislative Assembly Achanta

Election results

Assembly Elections 2004

Assembly Elections 2009

Assembly elections 2014

Assembly elections 2019

See also 
 List of constituencies of the Andhra Pradesh Legislative Assembly

References 

Assembly constituencies of Andhra Pradesh